The Schrankogel, 3497 m (called the Schrankogl on the AV map) is the second highest mountain in the Stubai Alps. The northeast side of the Schrankogel is steep and snowy; from all other sides the Schrankogel has a rocky character.

Mountains of the Alps
Alpine three-thousanders
Stubai Alps
Mountains of Tyrol (state)